Port d'Alcudia is a town and tourist resort in North East Majorca. It neighbours the town of Alcúdia and has many hotels and tourist venues located within the town. Port d'Alcudia has a large beach which links up to nearby Muro Beach.

Port d'Alcúdia is home to one of Europe's largest hotel complexes, the BelleVue Club. With 8 swimming pools and 17 apartment blocks the complex is set in 150,000 square meters of gardens. Its sister hotel the BelleVue Lagomonte is also located in Port d'Alcúdia.

References 

Populated places in Mallorca
Seaside resorts in Spain